Sphecops is a monotypic moth genus in the subfamily Arctiinae described by Orfila in 1935. Its single species, Sphecops arctata, was first described by Francis Walker in 1864. It is found in Brazil.

References

Arctiinae
Monotypic moth genera